Monasterevan G.F.C. is a Gaelic football club based in Monasterevin, County Kildare, Ireland. The club competes in the County Kildare GAA board league and cup system. They were Kildare "club of the year" in 1977. In 2012, Monasterevan G.F.C. won their first Leinster Intermediate Club Football Championship, beating Raheens in the county final on a scoreline of 1-10 to 0-07 and O’Connells of Louth 0-04 to 0-03 in the Leinster. 

Monasterevan were the first club in Ireland to win a football and hurling double, defeating Clane by 1-3 to 1-2, in the 1890 Kildare football final, and defeating Moorefield in the Kildare hurling final the same year.

Rosglas
Rosglas (Irish for Rosegreen, sometimes written as "Ros Glas") GAA club was founded in 1974 as a juvenile club. It currently serves as a hurling club. It has won five minor championship and league titles and won county championships at under-12, under-14 and under-16 level.

Honours
 Kildare Senior Football Championship: (3) 1890, 1911, 1977  Runners-up: 1907, 1910, 1912, 1973, 1976
 Leinster Intermediate Club Football Championship: 2012
 Kildare Intermediate Football Championship: (4) 1959, 1971, 2012, 2019
 Kildare Junior Football Championship: (4) 1906, 1910, 1935, 1954  Runners-up: 1930, 1945
 Kildare Senior B Football Championship: Runners-up: 1992
 Kildare Reserve "B" Football Championship: (1) 2013
 Kildare Junior C Football Championship: (1) 1998
 Kildare Under-21 B Football Shield Winners (2) 2011, 2013
 Kildare Minor Football Championship: (1) 1928  Runners-up: 1992
 Leinster Leader Cup: (2) 1973, 1974  Runners-up: 1975
 Kildare Junior Football League: (2) 1945, 1954  Runners-up: 1933, 1948;
 Kildare Junior Football League (Div 2): (2) 1993, 1995  Runners-up: 1973, 1996
 Kildare Junior Football League (Div 3B): (1) 1998
 Kildare Junior Football League (Div 4 South): (1) 2013
 Kildare Minor Football League (Div l): Runners-up: 1993
 Kildare Minor Football League (Div 2): (1) 1992
 Kildare Minor Football League (Div 3): (3) 1990, 2011, 2013  Runners-up: 2010
 Kildare Minor Football League (Div 4): (1)  2008
 Keogh Cup: 2007, 2012, 2017
 Kildare Under 21 Champions: 2016

Notable players

 Hugh Hyland

Bibliography
 
 
 
 Kildare GAA yearbook, 1972, 1974, 1978, 1979, 1980 and 2000 (in sequence especially the Millennium yearbook of 2000)

References

External links
Official Monasterevan GFC site

Gaelic games clubs in County Kildare
Gaelic football clubs in County Kildare